Elvir Hadžić (born January 18, 1999) is a Bosnian footballer currently playing for FC Wels.

Club career
An attacker, Hadžić made his debut as a substitute in the Hungarian League on April 14, 2018. He was given a yellow card during the warm up thus has the odd distinction of being booked by a referee before he had made his competitive professional debut.

Personal life
Elvir is the brother of Anel Hadžić who is also a footballer and represented the Bosnia national football team at the 2014 FIFA World Cup. Their cousin Damir Hadžić is also a professional footballer.

Club statistics

Updated to games played as of 25 May 2019.

References

External links
 

1999 births
Living people
People from Cazin
Association football forwards
Bosnia and Herzegovina footballers
Fehérvár FC players
FC Dornbirn 1913 players
FC Wels players
Nemzeti Bajnokság I players
2. Liga (Austria) players
Bosnia and Herzegovina expatriate footballers
Expatriate footballers in Hungary
Bosnia and Herzegovina expatriate sportspeople in Hungary
Austrian footballers
Bosnia and Herzegovina emigrants to Austria
Austrian expatriate sportspeople in Hungary
Austrian expatriate footballers